Canadian singer and songwriter Jessie Reyez has released two studio albums, two extended plays, twenty-seven singles (including seven as a featured artist) and two promotional singles. Her debut extended play, Kiddo, was released on April 21, 2017, by FMLY and Republic Records. It charted at number 83 in Canada. It includes her debut single, "Figures", which was certified double-platinum in Canada. It peaked in the country at number 58. Her second EP, Being Human in Public, was released on October 19, 2018. Her collaborative work with rapper Eminem has spawned two songs on his Kamikaze album.

Jessie's debut studio album, Before Love Came to Kill Us, was released on March 27, 2020, including the singles "Imported" with 6lack and "Love in the Dark", as well as a track with her common collaborator Eminem and her debut single "Figures".

Studio albums

Extended plays

Singles

As lead artist

As featured artist

Promotional singles

Notes

Other charted songs

Guest appearances

Songwriting credits

References

Discographies of Canadian artists